Les Gwynne (26 January 1893 – 25 October 1962) was an Australian cricketer. He played five first-class matches for New South Wales between 1924/25 and 1926/27.

See also
 List of New South Wales representative cricketers

References

External links
 

1893 births
1962 deaths
Australian cricketers
New South Wales cricketers
Cricketers from Sydney